Nurney is a village in County Kildare, Ireland, on the Tully Stream.

Location 
Nurney lies on the R415 regional road 8 km south of Kildare and is signposted from the M7 motorway at junction 13.

Transport
South Kildare Community Transport's Newbridge-Kildare-Athy bus route serves Nurney on Mondays to Fridays with two services each way a day. The bus also serves Kildare railway station, the nearest station to Nurney, enabling journeys to/from many parts of Ireland.

Amenities
The village has a church, a pub, a school, a shop and two graveyards. A petrol station and a takeaway shop opened in the village in recent times.

Skerries Irish Figure Dancing Class has been teaching Irish Figure dancing for over 40 years and classes are held weekly in the local GAA hall.

Demographics
In 2006, Nurney's population was recorded at 354, an increase of 48% from 2002 owing to an influx of settlers from Dublin, which lies approximately 60 km away. By the time of the 2016 census, the population had increased to 456 people.

Sport
Nurney GAA is the local Gaelic Athletic Association club.

See also
List of towns and villages in Ireland

References
 http://www.cso.ie/census/documents/census2006_Table_7_and_12.pdf
 http://www.irelands-directory.com/Carlow/Nurney/Entertainment/Pubs.html

Towns and villages in County Kildare